Conditions (full title: Conditions: a feminist magazine of writing by women with a particular emphasis on writing by lesbians) was a lesbian feminist literary magazine that came out biannually from 1976 to 1980 and annually from 1980 until 1990, and included poetry, prose, essays, book reviews, and interviews. It was founded in Brooklyn, New York, by Elly Bulkin, Jan Clausen, Irena Klepfisz and Rima Shore.

Publishing collective
Conditions was a magazine that emphasized the lives and writings of lesbians, and, throughout its history, maintained an all-lesbian collective. This collective expressed a "long standing commitment to diversity; of writing style and content and of background of contributors", within the lesbian and feminist communities. Conditions was especially dedicated to publishing the work of lesbians, in particular working-class lesbians and lesbians of color. While the founders were all white, Conditions was committed to promoting multiracial, multicultural, and multiethnic voices from its inception. By the early 1980s, the magazine had a diverse group of editors, especially under the leadership of Cheryl L. Clarke.

The Black Women's Issue
The journal's fifth issue, published in November 1979, was edited by Barbara Smith and Lorraine Bethel. Conditions 5 was "the first widely distributed  collection of Black feminist writing in the U.S.", and was later to be the basis for the anthology Home Girls: A Black Feminist Anthology (1983), one of the first books released by Kitchen Table: Women of Color Press. Conditions 5: The Black Women's Issue was hugely popular, and set a record in feminist publishing by selling 3,000 copies in the first three weeks it was available.

Publication ceases
Conditions ceased publication in 1990. It ended because the existing collective members were focusing on other projects and they were unable to find new members.

Editors

 Barbara Smith
 Lorraine Bethel
 Dorothy Allison
 Cheryl L. Clarke
 Jewelle Gomez
 Nancy Clarke Otter
 Debbi Schaubman
 Elly Bulkin
 Jan Clausen
 Irena Klepfisz
 Rima Shore
 Melinda Goodman
 Paula Martinac
 N. Mirtha Quintanales
 Randye Lordon

Selected contributors

 Wilmette Brown
 Joy Harjo
 Cherríe Moraga
 Joan Nestle
 Amber Hollibaugh
 Donna Allegra
 Becky Birtha
 Audre Lorde
 Ann Allen Shockley
 Beverly Smith
 Gloria Anzaldúa
 Joan Larkin
 Paula Gunn Allen
 Jacqueline Lapidus
 Adrienne Rich
 Michelle Cliff
 Hattie Gossett
 Chrystos
 Marilyn Hacker
 Mitsuye Yamada
 Jo Carillo
 Toi Derricotte
 Minnie Bruce Pratt
 Bonnie Zimmerman
 Elly Bulkin
 Cheryl Clarke
 Dorothy Allison
 Irena Klepfisz
 Jewelle Gomez
 Honor Moore
 Luzma Umpierre
 Linda Smukler (Samuel Ace)
 Ramina Mays
 Barbara Banks
 Mab Segrest
 Sapphire

See also
 List of lesbian periodicals

References

Annual magazines published in the United States
Defunct women's magazines published in the United States
Feminism in New York City
Feminist magazines
History of women in New York City
Lesbian culture in New York (state)
LGBT history in New York City
Lesbian feminist literature
Lesbian history in the United States
Lesbian working-class culture
Multicultural feminism
Magazines established in 1976
Magazines disestablished in 1990
Magazines published in New York City
Biannual magazines published in the United States
1976 establishments in New York City
1976 in LGBT history
Working-class culture in New York City